The Polytechnic University of San Luis Potosí (in Spanish: Universidad Politécnica de San Luis Potosí, UPSLP) was created on 27 June 2001 and was the first Polytechnic University of the Subsystem of Polytechnic Universities.

Besides the academic programs, the university offers a series of professional certifications, such as: The FCE by University of Cambridge, the MOS certification by Microsoft, and other certifications offered by Cisco Systems, or Sun Microsystems.

The campus of the university was built using a Project for Rendering of Services (PPS in Spanish); being the first higher education institution in Mexico created under this modality. Acciona is the company in charge of rendering the services until the year 2027

Academic model
The university is founded on a flexible model that offers student different exit points during their studies. A student can complete a "Professional Associate" degree after two years, a "University Technician" program after three years and a bachelor's degree after four-and-a-half years. The model also offers a tutorial program, for which each student is closely supervised by the faculty.

Undergraduate programs

Unlike the rest of the universities of the sub-system, the UPSLP offers all its program in nine semesters (4.5 years).

The university offers six programs:
 Information Technology Engineering
 Telematics Engineering
 Manufacturing Technology Engineering
 Systems and Industrial Technology Engineering
 International Marketing
 Administration and Management

Academic Division

The academic vice-provost is the highest academic position of the university and reports directly to the president/provost of the university. There are three divisions that oversee the academic development of the university:

 Division of Administration and Humanities
 Division of New Technologies
 Division of Manufacturing and Basic Sciences

These three divisions report to the vice-provost and are in charge of the undergraduate programs. In a micro-level, the university is divided into "academies". Each academy is in charge of offering the lectures for the undergraduate program. The academies report to head of division. The academies are

 Mathematics
 Sciences
 English
 Humanities
 Computing
 Marketing
 Management and Administration
 Manufacturing and Industrial Systems

However, since its conception, the positions of head of the Divisions of New Technologies and Manufacturing and Basic Sciences are vacant, as well as those of undergraduate program coordinators.

References

Public universities and colleges in Mexico
Universities and colleges in San Luis Potosí
Educational institutions established in 2001
2001 establishments in Mexico